Grosse-Île is one of two municipalities forming the urban agglomeration of Îles-de-la-Madeleine in Quebec, Canada. It is part of the Gaspésie–Îles-de-la-Madeleine region, and its population was 464 as of the 2021 Census.

As part of a municipal reorganization across Quebec, the seven communities of the Magdalen Islands amalgamated to form the municipality of Les Îles-de-la-Madeleine on January 1, 2002. However, after a 2004 referendum, Grosse-Île decided to split from the municipality, effective January 1, 2006.

French-speaking people would come and establish themselves just after, as seen by a Catholic parish founded in 1793. Today, Grosse-Île remains one of three communities of the archipelago to be predominantly English-speaking, the other being Entry Island and Old Harry (a hamlet located within the municipal boundaries of Grosse-Île).

Demographics

Population

Language

See also
List of municipalities in Quebec

References

Commission de toponymie du Québec
Ministère des Affaires municipales, des Régions et de l'Occupation du territoire 

Incorporated places in Gaspésie–Îles-de-la-Madeleine
Municipalities in Quebec
Magdalen Islands